The Lindbergh Kidnapping Case is a 1976 American television film dramatization of the Lindbergh kidnapping, directed by Buzz Kulik and starting Cliff DeYoung, Anthony Hopkins, Martin Balsam, Joseph Cotten, and Walter Pidgeon. It first aired on the NBC network on February 26, 1976.

Plot
The film opens with archive footage of Charles Lindbergh's pioneering 1927 transatlantic flight in the Spirit of St. Louis and the song “Lindbergh (The Eagle of the U.S.A.)”.

Hopewell, New Jersey, March 1, 1932.  After preparing a bath, Anne Morrow Lindbergh (Sian Barbara Allen) is alerted by her nurse, Betty Gow, that her baby is not in its crib.  They check with Charles Lindbergh (Cliff DeYoung), reading in his study, that the baby is not with him then immediately go to the nursery and discover an envelope near the window.  Lindbergh orders Betty to ask their butler to call the police.  Lindbergh informs his wife not to interfere with anything in the nursery and that their baby has been stolen.

The police investigate the Lindbergh home and establish a command post in the garage.  A ladder is found outside the nursery window along with a nearby footprint.  Inside the house, the envelope is opened and Lindbergh reads a letter indicating his child is in good care and future communications with have a distinctive signature with three holes in the paper.

The press quickly descend on the house and the police are angered when a reporter attempts to gain a statement from Lindbergh.

In New York City, the police department consider the possibilities that the child was kidnapped by organised criminals.  They are advised by a criminal profiler that the kidnapper is likely to be acting on their own as they only asked for $50,000, and an individual who is jealous of Lindbergh's status.

In New York City, concerned citizen Dr John Condon (Joseph Cotten) decides to write to the Bronx Home News newspaper to offer himself as an intermediary in the ransom exchange.  Condon receives a reply from the kidnapper and telephones Lindbergh, giving him confirmation that the letter has the unique signature with three holes in the paper with a demand for $70,000.

Condon later telephones Lindbergh to inform him that he has received a package with the sleeping garment of the child.  Lindbergh dons a disguise and is able to drive away from his home without attracting the attention of the massed press.  Lindbergh identifies the garment and also retrieves instructions for the rendezvous to pay the ransom.

The Bronx, April 2, 1932.  Condon and Lindbergh drive to a cemetery to hand over the ransom.  Lindbergh stays in the car while Condon meets the kidnapper.  The kidnapper speaks with a German accent and tells Condon that his name is John. Condon hands over the ransom but is told that further instructions will be given on where to retrieve the child.  Despite a search by air for a boat indicated in the instructions, they are unable to find the child.

The following month, the body of the child is found just two miles from the Lindbergh home.  Lindbergh identifies the body at that of his missing child.

By November 1933, New York City detectives are tracing Gold Certificates, contained in the ransom money, that are now entering circulation.

On September 15, 1934, a breakthrough is made when a gas station attendant receives a gold certificate from a customer. 
The attendant had been notified to watch out for ransom banknotes and wrote the car licence plate on a gold certificate he received.  Under questioning, he describes the customer as having a German accent. The car was a brown Plymouth Sedan and is identified as belonging to Bruno Hauptmann (Anthony Hopkins), resident in the Bronx.

The detectives stake out Hauptmann's home and identify his car.  After following Hauptmann, they decide to stop him quickly and find ransom money on his person.  At his home, Hauptmann protests his innocence.  Stripping his garage, the police find $14,000 ransom money hidden inside with matching serial numbers.  Hauptmann is arrested.

On January 2, 1935, the trial of Hauptmann begins in Flemington, New Jersey.  Evidence is presented to connect Hauptmann to the ransom letters and ladder, the wood of which came from his attic.

At the conclusion of the trial, Hauptmann is permitted to see his wife and his own child.  Outside the courthouse, an angry mob are calling for the death penalty. Hauptmann remarks on his innocence and that the jury has deliberated for eleven hours, and that this is a good sign.

Returning for the verdict, Hauptmann is found guilty.  Cheering erupts in the courtroom and the mob applaud outside.  Hauptmann is sentenced to death and later electrocuted on April 3, 1936, after being informed all appeals have failed.

The Lindberghs decide to leave the country and move to England, where they are informed of Hauptmann's execution.

Cast

Cliff DeYoung as Charles Lindbergh
Anthony Hopkins as Bruno Hauptmann
Denise Alexander as Violet Sharpe
Sian Barbara Allen as Anne Morrow Lindbergh
Martin Balsam as Edward J. Reilly
Joseph Cotten as Dr. John F. Condon
Peter Donat as Col. H. Norman Schwarzkopf
John Fink as Mr. Anderson
Dean Jagger as Koehler
Laurence Luckinbill as Gov. Hal Hoffman
Frank Marth as Chief Harry Wolfe
Walter Pidgeon as Judge Trenchard
Tony Roberts as Lt. Jim Finn
Robert Sampson as John Curtis
David Spielberg as David Wilentz
Joseph Stern as Dr. Schonfeld
Kate Woodville as Betty Gow
Keenan Wynn as Fred Huisache
Alan Beckwith as Walter Lyle

Reception

Awards and nominations 
The production was nominated for a Golden Globe for Best Motion Picture Made for TV.  Anthony Hopkins won a Primetime Emmy Award for Outstanding Lead Actor in a Miniseries or a Movie.

References

External links
 

1976 television films
1976 films
Cultural depictions of Charles Lindbergh
Films directed by Buzz Kulik
Films scored by Billy Goldenberg
Films set in the 1930s
Films about child abduction in the United States
Lindbergh kidnapping
NBC network original films
Crime films based on actual events
Films set in New Jersey